The 2015–16 Úrvalsdeild kvenna was the 58th season of the Úrvalsdeild kvenna, the top tier women's basketball league on Iceland. The season started on October 14, 2015 and ended on April 24, 2016. Snæfell won its third straight title by defeating Haukar 3–2 in the Finals.

Competition format
The participating teams first played a conventional round-robin schedule with every team playing each opponent twice "home" and twice "away" for a total of 24 games. The top four teams qualified for the championship playoffs while none were relegated to Division 1 due to vacant berths.

Regular season

Playoffs

Notable occurrences
In October 2015, Haukar added former Washington University in St. Louis point guard Shanna-Lei Dacanay.

References

External links
Official Icelandic Basketball Federation website
2015-2016 Úrvalsdeild statistics

Icelandic
Lea
Úrvalsdeild kvenna seasons (basketball)